Sir Herbert Jeffreys (b. around 1620–1625 – d. 17 December 1678) was a British military officer and lieutenant governor of Virginia Colony who served as acting governor in the immediate aftermath of Bacon's Rebellion. Historians have described Jeffreys as a "chief troubleshooter" and as "the most active and expert guardsman in the political police function of the courtier army."

Biography

Early life and family 
Jeffreys was born around 1620–1625 in Kirkham, North Yorkshire, England. Available records indicate that Jeffreys married Susanna Osborne and they had seven children during the period between 1666 and 1674. The Jeffreys family resided in Yorkshire and attended Saint Michael-Le-Belfry church.

Military service 
Jeffreys was a longtime military officer and staunch royalist. From 1642 until 1648, he fought for King Charles I in the English Civil War. During the period following, Jeffreys was in French exile, where he served on the military staff of Charles I's second son, James, Duke of York. While in Flanders, Jeffreys supported the repression of the Fronde provincial revolts between 1648 and 1653 and helped to form the Guards of Charles II. After the restoration of Charles II as King of England, Jeffreys served the crown as commander of Guards Garrison companies in Portsmouth, York, the Isle of Jersey, and London. He served as deputy governor of York for over eight years and assumed martial command in 1670. He attained the rank of captain and later lieutenant colonel in the Royal English Army.

Virginia political career 
In November 1676, Jeffreys was appointed by Charles II as a lieutenant governor of Virginia colony and arrived in Virginia in February 1677. During Bacon's Rebellion, Jeffreys was commander-in-chief of the regiment of six warships carrying over 1,100 troops, tasked with quelling and pacifying the rebellion upon their arrival. He served as leader of a three-member commission (alongside Sir John Berry and Francis Moryson) to inquire into the causes of discontent and political strife in the colony. The commission published a report for the King titled "A True Narrative of the Rise, Progresse, and Cessation of the late Rebellion in Virginia," which provided an official report and history of the insurrection.

On 27 April 1677 and with the support of the King, Jeffreys assumed the role of acting colonial governor following Bacon's Rebellion, succeeding his political rival Governor Sir William Berkeley after he was formally recalled to England and convinced to vacate the colony. Shortly after Jeffreys took over as acting governor, Berkeley angrily remarked that Jeffreys had an "irresistible desire to rule this country" and that his action could not be justified. He wrote to Jeffreys, "I believe that the inhabitants of this Colony will quickly find a difference between your management and mine."

As acting governor, Jeffreys was responsible for appeasing the remaining factions of resistance and reforming the colonial government to be once more under direct Crown control.

As acting governor, Jeffreys presided over the Treaty of 1677, the formal peace treaty between the Crown and representatives from various Virginia Native American tribes that was signed on 28 May 1677. In October 1677, Jeffreys persuaded the Virginia General Assembly to pass an act of amnesty for all of the participants in Bacon's Rebellion, and levied fines against any citizen of the colony that called another a "traitor" or "rebel." Jeffreys led efforts to rebuild and restore the state house and colonial capital of Jamestown which had been burned and looted during the rebellion.

As acting governor, Jeffreys was known for suspending some of his most outspoken critics from office. He was strongly opposed by the "Green Spring faction" of members of the assembly and Governor's council, who remained loyal to Berkeley. Philip Ludwell referred to Jeffreys as "a pitiful little fellow with a periwig."

Death 
Jeffreys died on December 17, 1678, at the age of 53–58. He was one of the first colonial governors of Virginia to die while in office and was generally unpopular among Virginia's public at the time of his death. He was immediately succeeded by Henry Chicheley as acting governor.

See also 

 Colony of Virginia
 Virginia History
 List of colonial governors of Virginia

Notes

References 

 The Columbia Electronic Encyclopedia, 6th ed.

External links 

 Biography at Encyclopedia Virginia

Colonial governors of Virginia
1620s births
1678 deaths
English emigrants
English Civil War